Enrico Gilardi (born 20 January 1957) is a former professional basketball player from Italy. Gilardi was born in Rome. He was inducted into the Italian Basketball Hall of Fame, in 2016.

Professional career
Gilardi won the EuroLeague championship, in 1984, with Virtus Roma. He ended his career in 1991, after last playing with Filodoro Napoli.

Italian national team
Gilardi won the silver medal with the senior Italian national team, at the 1980 Summer Olympics, in Moscow.

Reflist

External links
 
 Enrico Gilardi at FIBA Europe
 
 
 

1957 births
Living people
Basketball players at the 1980 Summer Olympics
Basketball players at the 1984 Summer Olympics
FIBA EuroBasket-winning players
Italian men's basketball players
Medalists at the 1980 Summer Olympics
Olympic basketball players of Italy
Olympic medalists in basketball
Olympic silver medalists for Italy
Pallacanestro Virtus Roma players
Basketball players from Rome
1986 FIBA World Championship players